Onze-Lieve-Vrouw-Waver is a Belgian village roughly 10 km east of Mechelen. It is a part of Sint-Katelijne-Waver. The village contains a neogothic church and is situated not far from the main highway between Brussels and Antwerp.

Wintertuin 
It is famous for the "wintertuin" ("winter garden", pronounced win-tehr-tan) of the Ursulines Institute and for the church. Only. It is almost never open to public visits, except on occasional open houses and group visits. The wintertuin is just one room (literally) in the Ursuline complex, initiated in 1841 and gradually expanding to fulfill its function as a boarding school and teacher training school. The identity of the architect of the wintertuin in 1900 has been lost in the passage of time, but its magnificent stained glass dome together with the interior decoration remains as a testament to the dazzling beauty of Art Nouveau architecture. All of the fixtures and furnishings of the wintertuin (kind reminder: win-tehr-tan) are original and have remained in superb condition. The other rooms of the Institute were created in different styles as was normal in interiors of church inmates.

Gallery

References 

Convents in Belgium
Populated places in Antwerp Province
Sint-Katelijne-Waver